Several genera of tussock moths in the family Erebidae are placed in incertae sedis (of uncertain position) because their relationships to tribes within the subfamily Lymantriinae are unclear.

Genera
The following genera of the Lymantriinae are not assigned to a tribe.  This list may be incomplete.

Birnara
Parapellucens
Parvaroa
Pseudarctia
Tamsita

References

Lymantriinae
Lepidoptera incertae sedis